The United Nations Alliance of Civilizations (UNAOC) is an initiative that attempts to "galvanize international action against extremism" through the forging of international, intercultural and interreligious dialogue and cooperation. The Alliance places a particular emphasis on defusing tensions between the Western and Islamic worlds.

The initiative was first proposed by the Prime Minister of Spain, José Luis Rodríguez Zapatero, at the 59th General Assembly of the United Nations (UN) in 2005. It was co-sponsored by the Turkish Prime Minister, Recep Tayyip Erdoğan.

On 14 July 2005, United Nations Secretary-General Kofi Annan formally proclaimed the launch of the Alliance of Civilizations at the United Nations Headquarters  with the co-sponsorship of the governments of Spain and Turkey.

On 10 November 2009, the United Nations General Assembly recognized the mandate of the Alliance of Civilizations by adopting resolution A/RES/64/14 "The Alliance of Civilization", acknowledging the importance of intercultural and interreligious dialogue in promoting tolerance and expressing its continuous support for the work of the Alliance of Civilizations.

On 6 July 2015, Member States demonstrated their support for the work and achievements of the Alliance of Civilizations and adopted by consensus General Assembly resolution A/RES/69/312 "United Nations Alliance of Civilizations", hence affirming the status of the United Nations Alliance of Civilizations (UNAOC) as an initiative of the United Nations Secretary-General, an entity within the United Nations system.

Inception 
The group argues that mutual suspicion, fear and misunderstanding between Islamic and Christian Western societies has been increasing since the beginning of the new millennium. The heightened instability of coexistence between these groups of people with divergent backgrounds has led to exploitation by alleged extremists throughout the world: the severest form of this being outrageous acts of violence. "It has been the opinion of many political leaders that efforts should be made to reach a common ground between diverse ethnic and religious groups based on the tolerance, understanding, and respect of the fundamental set of values and beliefs of each group." In this way, and by the attempt to quell "extremism", a comprehensive coalition can be established to work toward peaceful coexistence between diverse groups around the world, and thereby support international stability.

The Alliance of Civilizations initiative was proposed by the Spanish Prime Minister, José Luis Rodríguez Zapatero, at the 59th General Assembly of the United Nations in 2005. It was co-sponsored by the Turkish Prime Minister, Recep Tayyip Erdoğan. The aim of the initiative was to produce actionable, time-bound recommendations by the end of 2006 for UN member states to adopt.

To fulfill the objective of the initiative, UN Secretary-General Kofi Annan assembled a High-Level Group (HLG) consisting of 20 eminent persons drawn from policy making, academia, civil society, religious leadership, and the media. A full range of religions and civilizations were represented. Among the members were former Iranian President Mohammad Khatami, who proposed the Dialogue Among Civilizations initiative, Archbishop Desmond Tutu, South African Nobel laureate, Prof. Pan Guang, who obtained the Saint Petersburg-300 Medal for Contribution to China-Russia Relations, and Arthur Schneier, who is the founder and president of the “Appeal of Conscience Foundation” and who gained the "Presidential Citizens Medal”. The HLG met five times between November 2005 and November 2006, and produced a report prioritising relations between the Western and Muslim societies.

The first meeting of the HLG of the AoC occurred in Spain in November 2005. The second meeting was in Doha, Qatar, from 25 to 27 February 2006 with the agenda of aiming to find ways to calm the cartoon crisis between West and Islamic world. The third meeting took place in Dakar, Senegal, from 28 to 30 May 2006. At the final meeting in November 2006 in Istanbul, the members presented their final report to Kofi Annan and to Prime Ministers José Luis Rodríguez Zapatero and Recep Tayyip Erdoğan. The report outlined recommendations and practical solutions on how the Western and Islamic societies can solve misconceptions and misunderstandings between them. According to the report, "politics, not religion, is at the heart of growing Muslim-Western divide", although a large emphasis is maintained on religion.

The High-Level Group’s report, published on 13 November 2006, put forth recommendations that became the guiding principles for the implementation of the Alliance. In particular, it identified four priority areas of action for the Alliance of Civilizations, which all play a critical role in reducing cross-cultural tensions and building bridges between communities, and to which the Alliance of Civilizations should bring a multidisciplinary and multi-perspective approach: Youth, Education, Media, and Migration.

In May 2007, UNAOC released its "Implementation Plan 2007–2009", which elaborated on the notion that the AoC will not replace or reconstitute any existing plans or political channels. Rather, the AoC will facilitate its goals primarily through partnership operations among a variety of existing groups, and also through projects in youth, education, media, and migration.
The core of the 16-page document consists of two parts. The first part, drawing directly on the 2006 HLG report, describes the strategic and structural framework for the AoC. Included are plans for an AoC forum held in varying locations annually, the "Group of Friends" representatives from States and international organisations, and UN Secretary-General-appointed ambassadors to the AoC. Financing will be accomplished via the AoC Voluntary Trust Fund with support from various organisations.
The second part of the plan calls for actions to staff the office of the Secretariat by Summer 2007, and to implement the directives established in the first part of the document. A mid-term review of the plan of action is intended in 2008. The first group of ambassadors will be listed by the end of 2007, and the first annual AoC forum will be held 15–16 January in 2008 in Spain, with a focus on youth. The AoC will establish a rapid-response media-based mechanism to intervene in escalations of global tension.
The plans were discussed with UN Secretary-General Ban Ki-moon on 14 June 2007.

On 24 June, Ban Ki-moon spoke at a commemoration of 13th century Muslim poet Rumi in New York, in which he embraced the teachings of the poet, expressing the resonance with the goals of the AoC.

Structure and leadership 

The "High Representative for the Alliance of Civilizations" is the title of the primary leadership position of UNAOC, who is to function as political facilitator and lead spokesman, and to consult directly with the United Nations Secretary-General. In April 2007, Secretary-General Ban Ki-moon assigned the position of High Representative to Jorge Sampaio, former President of Portugal. In February 2013, Nassir Abdulaziz Al-Nasser assumed the post of High Representative, succeeding President Sampaio in the position. In January 2019, he was succeeded by Mr. Miguel Ángel Moratinos, former Minister of Foreign Affairs of Spain.

The Secretariat of the Alliance of Civilizations provides support to the High Representative and implements developmental functions of the AoC. The offices are based at the United Nations headquarters in New York.

Priority areas

Media 
Traditional and new media play a crucial role in influencing public perception, narratives, and attitudes and therefore hold the potential to bridge cultural divides. With the advent of the web and a plethora of new news sources, social media, blogs, and other websites run by citizen journalists, UNAOC media projects focus on building the critical media literacy skills required to receive the ever-increasing speed and volume of information, and on training journalists so they can do their work to the best of their abilities.

Youth 
Young people are critical agents for social change, economic growth, development and technological innovation. It is crucial to recognize youth not only as a source of mobilization, but as autonomous actors and partners. They are our most important pool of talent, ideas, energy, and passion. Through education, training, and many other opportunities for innovation and creativity, UNAOC empowers youth globally and recognize them as powerful agents for social change.

Education 
Education systems today face the challenge of preparing young people for an interdependent world that is unsettling to individual and collective identities. Education about one’s own history fosters a sense of community and solidarity, but it must be balanced by knowledge of global issues and an understanding and appreciation of other societies and cultures. Education in its various forms – including music, sports, art, drama and film – can help build bridges between communities and people. Through its education programmes, UNAOC enables citizens to acquire intercultural competencies and critical thinking skills to help foster cross-cultural dialogue and overcome cultural stereotypes and intolerance.

Migration 
Virtually every state is both a country of origin and of destination for migrants. In a world of porous borders, rapidly evolving modes of transportation and communications, and globalized economies, diverse populations are destined to interact. This phenomenon presents new challenges that need to be addressed, but also opportunities that need to be harnessed. With its migration programmes, UNAOC addresses the many facets of migration with the goal of fostering inclusive societies that respect the human rights of all.

Women as Peace Mediators 
The new High Representative Mr. Moratinos intends to propose adding “women as peace mediators” to the areas of focus of UNAOC. Integral to the vision of the United Nations Secretary-General on prevention is the inclusion and women’s empowerment in their fullest sense. He has committed to integrate gender perspectives in mediation efforts dispatching women leaders as mediation envoys.

UNAOC projects and initiatives 
 UNAOC Youth Solidarity Fund
 UNAOC Fellowship Programme
 UNAOC Young Peacebuilders
 Intercultural Innovation Award (IIA)
 Intercultural Leaders and Alumni Engagement (in partnership with BMW Group)
 #SpreadNoHate Initiative
 PLURAL+ Youth Video Festival (in partnership with IOM)
 PEACEapp
 Media and Information Literacy

UNAOC Global Forums 
In its 2006 report, the UNAOC High-Level Group recommended that UNAOC organize a recurring Global Forum under United Nations auspices to provide a regular venue for representatives of governments, international organizations, civil society, and the private sector to forge partnerships and to express commitments for action.

UNAOC convened its first Global Forum in Madrid, Spain, in 2008. Since then, it has organized seven additional Global Forums in Istanbul, Turkey (2009); Rio de Janeiro, Brazil (2010); Doha, Qatar (2011); Vienna, Austria (2013); Bali, Indonesia (2014); Baku, Azerbaijan (2016); and at United Nations Headquarters in New York (2018).

2008 Forum: Madrid, Spain 
The first forum of the Alliance of Civilizations was held in Madrid, Spain, on 15–16 January 2008. It was attended by over 900 participants in 89 official delegations from 78 countries.

The forum was hosted by the monarchy of Spain, and it convened leaders, activists, scholars, and public figures from every region of the world in an effort to find new ways to bridge the growing divide between nations and cultures, and to establish new partnerships to promote global understanding.

Over one and a half days, political leaders including heads of State and Government; Ministers and senior officials; civil society activists and Nobel laureates; corporate executives; religious leaders; and leading scholars dialogued and debated with each other, launched practical initiatives and made commitments to action aimed at improving relations across regions and cultures.

Among the results were the announcement of a number of initiatives concerning media, educational and other programmes to advance AoC objectives in various countries, and the signing of Memoranda of Understanding with UNESCO, the League of Arab States, ISESCO, the Arab League Educational, Cultural and Scientific Organization (ALECSO), and United Cities and Local Governments (UCLG), and a Letter of Intent with the Council of Europe.

2009 Forum: Istanbul, Turkey 
The second Forum of the Alliance of Civilizations was held in Istanbul, Turkey, on 6–7 April 2009.

From 6–7 April 2009, nearly 2,000 participants—among them several Heads of Government. over 50 ministers, as well as policymakers, foundations, media and grassroots leaders from around the world—convened at the Çırağan Palace Hotel in Istanbul, Turkey, to forge new partnerships, generated ideas aimed at building trust and cooperation among diverse communities and advance the Civilizations' goals. The Forum also served as an opportunity to take stock of initiatives developed by the Alliance, to showcase practical projects in collaboration with civil society and corporate partners and to launch new programs.

The results of the forum emphasized the commitment of the Alliance to the existing initiatives, as well as new ones, such as the Education about Religions and Beliefs; Alliance Fellowship Program; Dialogue Cafe; PLURAL +; Restore Trust, Rebuild Bridges; Mapping Media Education Policies in the World: Visions, Programs and Challenges; and the Alliance of Civilizations Research Network. The Alliance also was able to establish partnership agreements with seven international networks, such as the International Organization for Migration, the Organisation of the Islamic Conference, the Ibero-American General Secretariat, the Anna Lindh Foundation, Organisation internationale de la Francophonie, the Community of Portuguese Speaking Countries and the Union Latine.

The President of the United States, Barack Obama, who was visiting Istanbul that day, was originally expected to attend the second day of the meeting, but paid a surprise visit to the U.S. troops in Iraq instead.

2010 Forum: Rio de Janeiro, Brazil 

On 27–29 May 2010, a network of over 2,000 political and corporate leaders, civil society activists, youth, journalists, foundations, and religious leaders gathered in Rio de Janeiro, under the theme "Bridging Cultures, Building Peace," for the third United Nations Alliance of Civilizations' forum.

The theme of the conference set out key questions for the participants to discuss over the course of the three-day forum, these included:

 What kind of actions do we need to combat intolerance and prejudice?
 What tools do children and young people need to navigate an increasingly complex and multicultural world?
 What is the impact of globalization on people’s sense of belonging and identity?
 How do economic inequalities impact on relations among diverse communities?
 How can the media help bridge cross-‐cultural divides and change perceptions of the other?
 How can we create inclusive societies, founded on the respect for human rights and diversity?
 
Towards the conclusion of the Third Forum of the Alliance, the outcomes were announced by Jorge Sampaio, the High Representative of the UN Alliance of Civilizations and former President of Portugal. The results presented the commitments of all participants to the existing initiatives, as well as new ones, such as the inauguration of the first two Dialogue Cafés, which uses the latest video conferencing technology to connect young people in different parts of the world; the first conference of the Global Youth Movement; the creation of the United Nations University International Institute for the Alliance of Civilizations; and launching of the Online Community on Migration and Integration in partnership with the International Organization for Migration.

Recognition 
In 2007 the Alliance was presented with the "Dialogue of Civilizations" award, which was given by the Rumi Forum and the Georgetown University Center for Peace and Security Research in Washington. Spanish Prime Minister José Luis Rodriguez Zapatero and Turkish Prime Minister Recep Tayyip Erdoğan received the award.

Criticism 
UNAOC was criticised for its partiality of Abrahamic religions — Islam, Christianity and Judaism — over others. In a UN General Assembly discussion on resolutions of the UN Alliance of Civilizations on the Culture of Peace, India asked the United Nations to recognise violence against religious minorities such as Hinduism, Buddhism, Jainism, and Sikhism.

References

Further reading

External links 

 Official Webpage - United Nations Alliance of Civilizations
 Official Webpage – The Report of the High-level Group
 Online community on migration Integration: Building Inclusive Societies (IBIS)
 Official Turkish Webpage – Medeniyetler İttifakı
 Press release about AoC from the U.N. (7/14/2005)
 News Article from the Gulf Times
 The United Nations' AoC Forum in Istanbul: New Allies for the Dialogue of Civilizations
 Global Expert Finder Debate: The Future of Relations with the Muslim World

International cultural organizations
United Nations Secretariat
2005 establishments in New York City
Government agencies established in 2005